Douglas Shirl Barnett Jr.  (born April 12, 1960) is a former American football center in the National Football League (NFL) for the Washington Redskins, the Los Angeles Rams, and the Atlanta Falcons.  He played college football at Azusa Pacific University.

He was also the varsity football head coach for Bakersfield Christian High School until the 2009–10 season.

Head coaching record

College

References

1960 births
Living people
American football centers
Atlanta Falcons players
Azusa Pacific Cougars football players
Los Angeles Rams players
Rocky Mountain Battlin' Bears football coaches
Washington Redskins players
High school football coaches in California
Sportspeople from Montebello, California
Players of American football from California